Captain Paul Augustin Edouard Barbreau (16 September 1894 – 2 June 1976) was an Algerian-born French World War I flying ace credited with eight aerial victories.

Early life
Barbreau was born in Renault, Oran, Algeria, the son of Pierre Augustin Barbreau, an administrateur-adjoint, and Marie Louise Benoist. He joined the French Army on his twentieth birthday, 16 September 1914. His initial assignment was as a Soldat de 2e Classe in the 5e Regiment de Chasseurs d'Afrique. He was promoted to the rank of enlisted brigadier in November 1914, and to maréchal-des-logis on 6 February 1915.

World War I aviation service
Barbreau transferred to the army's military aviation branch in April 1917, reporting to Amberieu for pilot's training. On 14 May, he received Military Pilot's Brevet No. 6406. On 1 June, he passed on to Avord for advanced training. After polishing his skills at Pau and Cazaux, he was posted to a Nieuport squadron, Escadrille N 154, on 1 October 1917.

The squadron eventually upgraded its equipment to SPAD S.VII fighters, and subsequently changed its name to Escadrille SPA 154. Under the command of Michel Coiffard SPA 154 specialized in attacking enemy observation balloons, with Barbreau sharing their success, as he became a balloon buster, destroying eight between 2 June and 8 August 1918. His victories brought him the Médaille militaire and a temporary commission as an officer. He was transferred to Escadrille 164 on 8 August 1918.

List of aerial victories

Barbreau is believed to have flown some version of the SPAD to score his aerial victories.

Post World War I
Although his heroics ended at the ceasefire of 11 November 1918, he was not made a Chevalier of the Légion d'honneur until 12 July 1919, while serving as a second lieutenant (reserve) in Algeria. The accompanying citation mentioned victories over five enemy aircraft, but there is no individual listing or confirmation of these victories.

He eventually retired from the French Air Force with the rank of captain, receiving promotion to the rank of Officier of the Légion d'honneur on 31 October 1961.

He died in Marseilles on 2 June 1976.

Footnotes

References
Notes

Bibliography
 
  
 

1894 births
1976 deaths
People from Oran Province
French World War I flying aces
Officiers of the Légion d'honneur
Recipients of the Croix de Guerre 1914–1918 (France)
Recipients of the Médaille militaire (France)
Migrants from French Algeria to France